The Indian cricket team toured Zimbabwe from 10 to 19 July 2015. The tour consisted of three One Day International matches and two Twenty20 Internationals. All the matches were played in Harare. India won the ODI series 3–0 and the T20I series was drawn 1–1. Zimbabwe's win in the second T20I match was their first Twenty20 win over India.

In June Zimbabwe Cricket stated that the tour could be postponed to the next year, if broadcasting issues were not resolved. Sources close to the Board of Control for Cricket in India (BCCI) suggested that the tour would go ahead with India fielding a second-strength side, with the selection committee meeting in Delhi on 29 June to pick the squads. Indian team director Ravi Shastri missed the tour due to professional commitments that were agreed before the BCCI extended his contract. The Indian squad was announced on 29 June as planned.

Squads

On 6 July Indian bowler Karn Sharma was ruled out of the tour after fracturing a finger in his left hand. There was no replacement for him. This left the Indian team with only two spin options of Harbhajan Singh and Axar Patel. Indian batsman Ambati Rayudu was ruled out of the tour after the second ODI due to a quadricep injury. He was replaced by Sanju Samson.

ODI series

1st ODI

2nd ODI

3rd ODI

T20I series

1st T20I

2nd T20I

References

External links
 Series home at ESPNCricinfo

2015 in Indian cricket
2015 in Zimbabwean cricket
International cricket competitions in 2015
Indian cricket tours of Zimbabwe